Allain Gaussin (born 6 November 1943) is a noted French composer.

Gaussin was born in Saint-Sever-Calvados, Normandy. He is a laureate of the Conservatoire national supérieur de musique et de danse de Paris (CNSMDP) where he studied with Olivier Messiaen. He studied conducting with Louis Fourestier, piano with Hélène Boschi, and electroacoustic music with Pierre Schaeffer.

Gaussin taught orchestration from 2004 to 2011 at the music faculty of the Osaka University, and teaches composition at the American Conservatory in Fontainebleau.

Selected works
 Camaïeux (1983) for electric ensemble
 Chakra (1984) for string quartet
 Années-Lumière (1992) for large orchestra
 Irisation-Rituel (Grand prix du disque 1995 of the Académie Charles Cros)
 Mosaïque céleste (1997), chamber concerto for eleven instruments

Discography
 Eclipse, Ogive (for flute and harpsichord), Eau-Forte (collection MFA, disques Arpège-Calliope, 1983)
 Chakra for Arditti Quartet (collection MFA, disques Montaigne / Auvidis 1991)
 Irisation-Rituel, Camaïeux, Arcane, Salabert / Harmonia Mundi, 1995. Awarded Grand prix du disque (1995) by the Académie Charles Cros
 Ogive (flute and piano) Ensemble Triton II (disques REM 1996)

References

External links

Profile, Composers 21

1943 births
20th-century classical composers
20th-century French composers
20th-century French male musicians
21st-century classical composers
21st-century French composers
21st-century French male musicians
French classical composers
French male classical composers
Living people
Academic staff of Osaka University